Mathibeli is an African given name and surname. Notable people with the name include:

Mathibeli Mokhothu (born 1977), Lesotho educator and politician 
Teboho Mathibeli (born 1970), Lesotho boxer

Surnames of African origin
African given names